The Lewis & Clark Pioneers football team is the college football team of Lewis & Clark College in Portland, Oregon. The team competes in the Northwest Conference in NCAA Division III and plays its home games on campus at Griswold Stadium. The current head coach is Joe Bushman, who began his tenure in 2022; he was preceded by Jay Locey.

Formerly known as Albany College and based in Albany, its football program lost a record 28 consecutive games from 1931 to 1935. The school soon relocated to Portland and the football team has played under the Lewis & Clark name since 1946.

References

External links
 

 
1946 establishments in Oregon
American football teams established in 1946